Vəng may refer to:
Vəng, Ismailli, Azerbaijan
Vəng, Kalbajar, Azerbaijan

Veng may refer to:
Veng (Denmark)